Defluviimonas aquaemixtae is a Gram-negative bacterium from the genus of Defluviimonas which has been isolated from the Jeju island in Korea.

References 

Rhodobacteraceae
Bacteria described in 2014